The 37th Bomb Squadron is part of the 28th Bomb Wing at Ellsworth Air Force Base, South Dakota.  It operates Rockwell B-1 Lancer aircraft providing strategic bombing capability.

The squadron is one of the oldest in the United States Air Force, its origins dating to 13 June 1917, when the 37th Aero Squadron was organized at Kelly Field, Texas. The squadron deployed to France as part of the American Expeditionary Force during World War I and served as a training unit until returning to the US for demobilization.   It was active in the interwar years at Langley Field, Virginia as a pursuit and attack squadron.

The squadron saw combat as the 37th Bombardment Squadron, a Martin B-26 Marauder unit in the Mediterranean Theater of Operations during World War II, earning two Distinguished Unit Citations (DUC) for its performance.  It was inactivated after the war's end, although it was briefly active as a paper unit in 1947–1948.

The squadron was again activated during the Korean War, when it replaced a reserve unit that was being returned to reserve duty.  Flying night intruder missions with Douglas B-26 Invaders, the squadron earned another DUC before the truce in July 1953.  In 1955 it returned to the United States and became one of the first jet tactical bomber units, flying Martin B-57 Canberras and Douglas B-66 Destroyers.  After a brief deployment to England, the squadron once again inactivated.

In 1977, the 37th became part of the Strategic Air Command, flying Boeing B-52 Stratofortresses until 1982.  It assumed its present role in 1987.

The squadron is an honorary member of the NATO Tiger Association

History

World War I 
Established on 13 June 1917 at Kelly Field in Texas, the 37th Aero Squadron moved to France in early September. After a short spell at Étampes (18–23 September), it settled at the Issoudun Aerodrome, participating at the installation of the Third Aviation Instruction Center. Once declared operational, it started flight training for newly arrived American pilots and crew members.

Reaching Bordeaux c. 6 January 1919, the squadron stayed there until 18 March, when it board a transport to bring it back to the United States where it was demobilized.

Inter-war years
Reactivated at Langley Field, Virginia in September 1933 at as the 37th Pursuit Squadron, the squadron was attached to the 8th Pursuit Group and equipped with Curtiss P-6 Hawks, in March 1935 it became the 37th Attack Squadron with Curtiss A-8 Shrike and Northrop A-17 Nomad attack aircraft.  In January 1938, the squadron was inactivated.

World War II

Early operations and training
The squadron was redesignated the 37th Bombardment Squadron and activated at Barksdale Field, Louisiana on 1 February 1940 with Douglas B-18 Bolo bombers as one of the original squadrons of the 28th Composite Group, which was training for deployment to Alaska.  However, when the 28th Group moved to Alaska in February 1941, the squadron remained in the United States, at Lowry Field, Colorado.  In its place, the 73d Bombardment Squadron of the 17th Bombardment Group moved to Alaska in March.  The exchange of squadrons was completed in April and May 1941, as the 37th was reassigned to the 17th Group and the 73d to the 28th Group.  In June, the squadron moved to Pendleton Field, Oregon and was colocated with its parent group for the first time since the squadron's 1940 activation.

At Pendleton, the squadron transitioned into the North American B-25 Mitchell medium bomber.  Following the attack on Pearl Harbor, the 37th flew antisubmarine patrols off the Pacific coast until about March 1942.  Because the 17th Group was the first Army Air Forces unit to equip with the Mitchell, the squadron, along with the other squadrons of the 17th Group contributed aircrews for the Doolittle Raid on Tokyo, Japan on 6 April 1942.   After the Japanese Attack on Pearl Harbor, the squadron flew antisubmarine patrols over the Northwest Pacific coast until May 1942.

Photographs of Recent Operations

Combat operations in the Mediterranean

In June 1942, the squadron returned to Barksdale Field, where it began transitioning into the Martin B-26 Marauder.  Following Operation Torch, the invasion of North Africa in November 1942, the squadron moved to Algeria, where it began combat operations on 30 December.  The squadron flew interdiction and close air support missions, contributing to the defeat of Axis forces in Africa by May 1943.  In June 1943, the squadron conducted bombing attacks leading to the surrender of enemy forces in Pantelleria and Lampedusa.  The squadron participated in Operations Husky and Avalanche as the Allies moved into Sicily and Italy.

During the Allied drive toward Rome, the squadron was awarded a Distinguished Unit Citation (DUC) for an attack on airfields near Rome on 13 January 1944.  Its operations in Italy between April and June 1944 earned it the French Croix de Guerre with Palm.  In August 1944, the squadron bombed targets to support Operation Dragoon, the invasion of southern France.  The squadron continued operations through the remainder of the year.

Shortly before the end of the war, on 10 April 1945, the squadron participated in an attack on Schweinfurt, Germany, for which it received a second DUC.  Following V-E Day, the squadron participated in disarming German forces.  In November 1945, it returned to the United States and was inactivated at the port of embarkation.

Korean War

The squadron was reactivated in May 1947 by Tactical Air Command but it was not manned or equipped.  It was inactivated in September 1948.

The squadron was activated at Pusan East Air Base, Korea on 10 May 1952, when it assumed the mission, personnel and Douglas B-26 Invaders of the 729th Bombardment Squadron.  The 729th was a reserve unit that had been called to active duty for the Korean War and was being returned to reserve status. The squadron continued the night bombing operations of the 729th, concentrating on attacks on enemy lines of communication and troop concentrations.  In 1953, the squadron focused on attacking rail rolling stock, facilities and supplies.  Using Invaders with glass noses, the squadron developed techniques for conducting armed reconnaissance missions against locomotives and freight cars and began flying missions employing these tactics in February 1953.  It participated in Operation Spring Thaw and starting in March, attacked southbound routes along the East Coast of North Korea.  It continued operations until the July 1953 truce, and was awarded its third DUC for its operations.
 
The 37th remained in Korea as a precaution against the resumption of hostilities.  In September 1954, it relocated to Miho Air Base, Japan, It remained in Japan until the spring of 1955, when it returned to the United States for conversion to jet bombers.

Tactical jet bomber operations

Re-equipped with Martin B-57 Canberra jet bombers and conducted evaluation testing of the aircraft at Eglin Air Force Auxiliary Field No. 9; transitioned to Douglas B-66B Destroyers in 1956, the first squadron to receive the new tactical bomber. Deployed to RAF Sculthorpe, England briefly in 1958 before returning to Eglin and performing more testing on B-66s with Jet Assisted Take Off (JATO) and until being inactivated later in the year.

Strategic bombardment operations

The squadron joined the 28th Bombardment Wing at Ellsworth Air Force Base, becoming the wing's second Boeing B-52H Stratofortress squadron on 1 January 1977.  The squadron continued to fly the "Buff" until October 1982, when it was inactivated.

On 1 January 1987, the squadron activated and transitioned to its current aircraft, the Rockwell B-1B Lancer. Along with all other active bomber units in the air force it changed its name and became the 37th Bomb Squadron on 1 September 1991.  In December 1998, it became the first unit to employ the B-1 in combat in support of Operation Desert Fox in Iraq. One year later, crews from the squadron supported Operation Allied Force and flew combat operations in Kosovo and Serbia.

Since the 9/11 attacks, the 37th and its sister squadron at Ellsworth, the 34th Bomb Squadron have joined to provide aircraft and crews to form expeditionary units. These expeditionary units have flown missions contributing to the effort to drive the Taliban from Afghanistan. During this time, the combined squadrons flew 5 percent of the strike missions but released nearly 40 percent of the total bomb tonnage—more than 1,730 tons.  Its personnel have also employed the B-1 during Operation Iraqi Freedom, including a strike against high priority leadership targets in Baghdad.

In 2007, the 37th began regular deployments to the Middle East, rotating with other B-1 units, with one year at home station followed by six months deployed. On average squadron members fly over 6,000 combat hours and more than 500 combat sorties per deployment. Squadron personnel supported Libya strike missions during Operation Odyssey Dawn, the first B-1 combat mission launched from the United States to strike overseas targets.

Operation Odyssey Dawn

Lineage
 Organized as the 37th Aero Squadron on 13 June 1917
 Demobilized on 15 April 1919
 Reconstituted and redesignated 37th Pursuit Squadron on 24 March 1923
 Activated on 1 September 1933
 Redesignated 37th Attack Squadron on 1 March 1935
 Inactivated on 31 January 1938
 Redesignated 37th Bombardment Squadron (Medium) on 6 December 1939
 Activated on 1 February 1940
 Redesignated 37th Bombardment Squadron, Medium on 9 October 1944
 Inactivated on 26 November 1945
 Redesignated 37th Bombardment Squadron, Light on 29 April 1947
 Activated on 19 May 1947
 Inactivated on 10 September 1948
 Redesignated 37th Bombardment Squadron, Light, Night Intruder on 8 May 1952
 Activated on 10 May 1952
 Redesignated 37th Bombardment Squadron, Tactical on 1 October 1955
 Inactivated on 25 June 1958
 Redesignated 37th Bombardment Squadron, Heavy on 16 June 1977
 Activated on 1 July 1977
 Inactivated on 1 October 1982
 Activated on 1 January 1987
 Redesignated 37th Bomb Squadron on 1 September 1991

Assignments
 Unknown, 13 June 1917
 Third Aviation Instruction Center, Sep 1917
 Commanding General, Services of Supply, Jan-15 Apr 1919
 18th Pursuit Group (attached to 8th Pursuit Group), 1 September 1933
 2d Wing (remained attached to 8th Pursuit Group), 1 March 1935 – 31 January 1938
 28th Composite Group, 1 February 1940
 17th Bombardment Group, 23 April 1941 – 26 November 1945
 17th Bombardment Group, 19 May 1947 – 10 September 1948
 17th Bombardment Group, 10 May 1952 – 25 June 1958 (attached to 17th Bombardment Wing after 8 June 1957)
 28th Bombardment Wing, 1 July 1977 – 1 October 1982
 28th Bombardment Wing, 1 January 1987
 28th Operations Group, 1 September 1991

Stations

 Camp Kelly (later Kelly Field), Texas, 13 June–11 August 1917
 Étampes, France, 18 September 1917
 Issoudun Aerodrome, France, 23 September 1917
 Bordeaux, France, c. 6 January–c. 18 March 1919
 Mitchel Field, New York, c. 5–15 April 1919
 Langley Field, Virginia, 1 September 1933 – 31 January 1938
 Barksdale Field, Louisiana, 1 February 1940
 Lowry Field, Colorado, 10 July 1940
 Pendleton Field, Oregon, 29 June 1941
 Lexington County Airport, South Carolina, 16 February 1942
 Barksdale Field, Louisiana, 24 June–18 November 1942
 Telergma Airfield, Algeria, 21 December 1942
 Sedrata Airfield, Algeria, c. 13 May 1943
 Djedeida Airfield, Tunisia, c. 25 June 1943

 Villacidro Airfield, Sardinia, Italy, c. 5 December 1943
 Poretta Airfield, Corsica, France, 21 September 1944
 Dijon Airfield (Y-9), France, 20 November 1944
 Linz Airport, Austria, c. 16 June 1945
 Horsching, Austria, (Ground echelon), 6 July 1945
 Clastres Airfield (A-71), France, c. 3 October–c. 17 November 1945
 Camp Myles Standish, Massachusetts, 25–26 November 1945
 Langley Field (later Langley Air Force Base), Virginia, 19 May 1947 – 10 September 1948
 Pusan East Air Base (K-9), South Korea, 10 May 1952
 Miho Air Base, Japan, c. 9 October 1954 – c. 19 March 1955
 Eglin Air Force Auxiliary Field No. 9 (Hurlburt Field), Florida, 1 April 1955
 RAF Alconbury, England, 11 May 1958
 Hurlburt Field, Florida, 12 May–25 June 1958
 Ellsworth Air Force Base, South Dakota, 1 July 1977 – 1 October 1982
 Ellsworth Air Force Base, South Dakota, 1 January 1987 – present

Aircraft

Avro 504 (1918)
Sopwith Camel (1918)
DH-4 (1918)
Nieuport 27 (1918)
 Curtiss P-6 Hawk (1933–1935)
 Curtiss A-8 Shrike (1935–1936)
 Northrop A-17 Nomad (1936–1938)

 Douglas B-18 Bolo (1940–1941)
 North American B-25 Mitchell (1941–1942)
 Martin B-26 Marauder (1942–1945)
 Douglas B-26 Invader (1952–1956)
 Martin B-57A Canberra (1955–1956)
 Douglas B-66B Destroyer (1956–1958)
 Boeing B-52H Stratofortress (1977–1982)
 Rockwell B-1 Lancer (1987–present)

See also

 International military intervention against ISIL
 List of American aero squadrons
 List of B-1 units of the United States Air Force
 List of B-52 Units of the United States Air Force
 List of B-57 units of the United States Air Force
 List of Douglas A-26 Invader operators
 List of United States Air Force squadrons
 War on Terror

References
 Explanatory notes

 Citations

Bibliography

 
 
  (subscription required for web access)

External links
B-1B "Bone" Factsheet
28th Operations Group Fact Sheet

Military units and formations in South Dakota
037